The women's heptathlon event at the 1999 Pan American Games was held July 27–28.

Results

References

Athletics at the 1999 Pan American Games
1999
1999 in women's athletics